Crepidotus albolanatus, is a species of saprophytic fungus in the family Crepidotaceae with a stipeless sessile finely felted cap. Colour is pure white, cap diameter 10-35 mm and has been found in New Zealand on the debris of the nikau palm (Rhopalostylis sapida).

References

Crepidotaceae
Fungi of New Zealand